Skarvan and Roltdalen National Park is a national park in Trøndelag county, Norway.  The park is located in the municipalities of Selbu, Tydal, Meråker, and Stjørdal, not too far from the border with Sweden to the east.

The  park was opened in 2004 and it borders the Stråsjøen-Prestøyan nature reserve.  The park includes a large spruce forested area (the Roltdalen valley is the largest roadless mountain valley in southern Trøndelag county) as well as the Skarvan mountainous region which is typical of the Trøndelag region, both in cultural and natural history. 

The Skarvan mountains, which stretch from Ruten to Fongen is the most notable mountainous area in the region. Trondhjems Turistforening maintains a network of touring trails connecting Roltdalen to the trail network of the Nord-Trøndelag Tourist Association and trails in the Sylan area.

Names
The name of the park is a combination of two names. Skarvan is the finite plural of skarv which means "mountain without vegetation".  The first element in the name Roltdalen (for Rotldalen, see metathesis) comes from the river name Rotla and the last element is the finite form of dal which means "dale" and "valley". The meaning of the river name is unknown.

References

External links
 Map of Skarvan og Roltdalen National Park

National parks of Norway
Meråker
Stjørdal
Tydal
Selbu
Protected areas established in 2004
Protected areas of Trøndelag
Tourist attractions in Trøndelag
2004 establishments in Norway